is a Japanese manga series written and illustrated by Iou Kuroda. It was originally serialized in the seinen manga magazine Spirits Zōkan Ikki (re-branded as Monthly Ikki in 2003) between November 2000 and December 2002, with its chapters collected in two tankōbon volumes. Sexy Voice and Robo is currently unfinished. Kuroda stated that he had planned to continued the story some day. The series was licensed for English release in North America by Viz Media, who released it in a single volume in July 2005. It was adapted into a 11-episode Japanese television drama, which aired on Nippon TV between April and June 2007.

In 2002, Sexy Voice and Robo received the Grand Prize of the 6th Japan Media Arts Festival.

Plot
The story is about the adventures of a 14-year-old girl named Nico Hayashi, who uses her talents of changing and altering her voice to manipulate men over the phone who want to participate in enjo kōsai. Through this she learns a lot about human nature, and gains a keen understanding of people through their voices. An aging gangster notices her talents and decides to hire her to solve various cases.  While Nico is on her first case, she meets with a geeky man named Iichiro Sudo, who has an obsession with robot toy models. This obsession that leads Nico to call him "Robo", and the two become an unlikely team. After completing her first case Nico proclaims herself "Sexy Voice" and a variety of short loosely linked character-driven adventures ensue.

Characters
/

/

Media

Manga
Sexy Voice and Robo is written and illustrated by Iou Kuroda. It was serialized in Shogakukan's Spirits Zōkan Ikki (re-branded as Monthly Ikki in 2003) from November 30, 2000, to December 25, 2002. Shogakukan published the chapters into two tankōbon volumes, released on November 30, 2001, and February 28, 2003.< Sexy Voice and Robo was unfinished. In January 2007, Kuroda stated on his blog that he planned to write a continuation some day. In 2016, Kodansha republished the series with new cover illustrations and two additional stories on March 23 and April 22.

In North America, Viz Media released the series in a single 400-page volume on July 19, 2005.

Volume list

Drama
An 11-episode Japanese television drama, starring Kenichi Matsuyama as Robo and Suzuka Ohgo as Nico, was broadcast on Nippon TV from April 10 to June 19, 2007.

Reception
Sexy Voice and Robo won the Grand Prize of the Manga Division at the 6th Japan Media Arts Festival in 2002.

References

Further reading

External links

 on Nippon TV website 
 on VAP website 

2000 manga
2007 Japanese television series debuts
2007 Japanese television series endings
Japanese television dramas based on manga
Mystery anime and manga
Nippon TV dramas
Seinen manga
Shogakukan franchises
Shogakukan manga
Viz Media manga